Milan Řezníček (born 22 April 1947) is a Czech volleyball player. He competed in the men's tournament at the 1972 Summer Olympics.

References

1947 births
Living people
Czech men's volleyball players
Olympic volleyball players of Czechoslovakia
Volleyball players at the 1972 Summer Olympics
Sportspeople from Brno